Guthridge is a surname. Notable people with the surname include:

Bill Guthridge (1937–2015), American basketball player and coach
George Guthridge (born 1948), American writer
Nehemiah Guthridge (1812–1878), Australian businessman
Richard Charles Guthridge (1837–1934), Australian merchant seaman and farmer

See also
Lake Guthridge, lake in Sale, Victoria, Australia
Guthridge Nunataks, nunataks of Antarctica
Guthridge, Missouri, a community in the United States